Romeo McKnight (born March 25, 1998) is an American football defensive end for the Calgary Stampeders of the Canadian Football League (CFL). He played college football at Charlotte and was signed as an undrafted free agent by the Cleveland Browns after the 2021 NFL Draft.

College career
McKnight was ranked as a threestar recruit by 247Sports.com coming out of high school. He committed to Iowa on June 29, 2015. After two seasons at Iowa, McKnight decided to transfer from Iowa on May 13, 2018. He committed to Illinois State shortly thereafter. McKnight played two years at Illinois State before transferring to Charlotte on December 8, 2019.

Professional career

Cleveland Browns
McKnight was signed as an undrafted free agent by the Cleveland Browns on May 3, 2021, where he joined college teammate Tre Harbison. He was waived on August 25, 2021.

Calgary Stampeders
On May 31, 2022, McKnight signed with the Calgary Stampeders of the Canadian Football League (CFL). He was sent to the practice squad at the end of the preseason.

References

External links
Charlotte bio

1998 births
Living people
American football defensive ends
Charlotte 49ers football players
Cleveland Browns players
Illinois State Redbirds football players
People from Crystal Lake, Illinois
Players of American football from Illinois
Sportspeople from the Chicago metropolitan area
Iowa Hawkeyes football players